Antonio Mendez  may refer to:
Antonio Mendez (born 1940), American agent
Antonio Méndez (born 1970), Spanish athlete

See also
António Mendes (disambiguation)
Tony Mendez
Toni Mendez